That's What She Said may refer to:

 That's what she said, an exclamation exposing a double entendre
 That's What She Said (film), a 2012 American comedy film
 That's What She Said (EP), an EP by The Friday Night Boys
 "That's What She Said" (song), a song by The Automatic
 "That's What She Said", the tenth episode of the eighth season of King of the Hill

See also
That's What He Said (podcast), a podcast hosted by Greg James